Vittorio Roscio (born 20 February 1943 in Turin) was an Italian sprinter.

Biography
He won one medal at the International athletics competitions., he has 4 caps in national team from 1968 to 1973.

National titles
Vittorio Roscio has won one time the individual national championship.
1 win in the 60 metres indoor (1972)

See also
 Italy national relay team

References

External links
 Vittorio Roscio at CONI 

1943 births
Living people
Sportspeople from Turin
Italian male sprinters
Universiade medalists in athletics (track and field)
Universiade gold medalists for Italy
Medalists at the 1967 Summer Universiade